Abeeso Facula is a bright, irregular depression on the surface of Mercury, located at 21.7° N, 214.6° W.  It was named by the IAU in 2018.  Abeeso is the Somali word for snake.  The depression is the site of a volcanic explosion.

Abeeso Facula is near the southwestern rim of the Caloris basin.  Abeeso Facula is immediately southwest of Agwo Facula.

References

Surface features of Mercury